Law of Vietnam is based on communist legal theory and French civil law. In 1981 major reforms were made to the judicial and legal system.

New laws introduced since:

 Penal Code 1912

History 
1946:
 September 2, 1945 President Ho announced Independence Declaration
 November 9, 1946  the first constitution was adopted by the National Assembly
 Includes 7 chapters, 70 articles
1954: Geneva Agreement has been signed thanks to Dien Bien Phu victory.

1959: Constitution of the Democratic Republic of Vietnam, adopted on January 1, 1960. It consisted of X chapters, 112 articles

1975: The reunification of North and South Vietnam

1980: Constitution of the Socialist Republic of Vietnam, adopted on December 19, 1980

Includes XII chapters, 147 articles. The consequence of the policy of economic liberalization “Doi Moi” started in 1986.

April 15, 1992: Constitution of the Socialist Republic of the Vietnam includes XII chapters, 147 articles.

Law System of Socialist Republic of Vietnam

See also
 Constitution of the Socialist Republic of Vietnam
 Judiciary of Vietnam
 Legal systems of the world 
 Supreme People's Procuracy of Vietnam

References
 Law enforcement in Vietnam

External links
 28,000 Vietnamese laws translated into English - Search engine for laws translated into English.
 Guide to Law Online for Vietnam - US Library of Congress guide to Vietnamese legal system.
 1992 Constitution of Vietnam - Official translation into English
 ASEAN Law Association, Vietnam front page
  Vietnam Law & Legal Forum